Alain Motwani Marina (born 12 January 1984) is a retired Andorran footballer, who has played for Andorra national team, and a manager.

National team statistics

References

1984 births
Living people
People from Andorra la Vella
Andorran footballers
Andorra international footballers
Andorran football managers

Association football forwards